Hickory Hill is a historic home located at Clermont in Columbia County, New York.  The house was built in 1859 and is a square, two story, frame residence with a distinctive three bay pedimented facade in a late Greek Revival style.  It features a full width one story porch supported by Ionic order columns.  Also on the property is a brick smoke house.

It was added to the National Register of Historic Places in 1983.

References

Houses on the National Register of Historic Places in New York (state)
Greek Revival houses in New York (state)
Houses completed in 1859
Houses in Columbia County, New York
National Register of Historic Places in Columbia County, New York